Microspingus is a genus of  warbler-like birds in the tanager family Thraupidae. They are found in highland forest in South America.

Taxonomy and species list 
A molecular phylogenetic study published in 2014 found that the genus Poospiza was polyphyletic. In the resulting rearrangement to create monophyletic genera the genus Microspingus was resurrected. It had been introduced in 1874 by the Polish zoologist Władysław Taczanowski with the three-striped hemispingus as the type species. The genus name combines the Ancient Greek mikros meaning "small" with spingos meaning "finch".

The genus Microspingus is the sister taxon to a clade containing the black-backed bush tanager in the monospecific genus Urothraupis and the Pardusco in the monospecific genus Nephelornis.
 
The genus contains eight species:

References

 
Bird genera
Taxa named by Władysław Taczanowski